Denway Motors Limited was an investment holding company listed in Hong Kong. It engages in the manufacturing, assembly and trading of motor vehicles and automotive equipment and parts in China and Hong Kong through its group companies. It owns 50% of Guangqi Honda, a joint venture with Honda in Guangzhou, China.

The company's shares were oversubscribed more than 600 times when it was first listed in Hong Kong. In 2010, shareholders approved the privatization of Denway Motors by its parent company, Guangzhou Automobile Group. Denway Motors was delisted on 25 August 2010, replaced by the listing of Guangzhou Automobile Group on 30 August 2010 via stock swap.

External links
Denway Motors Limited

References

Auto parts suppliers of China
GAC Group divisions and subsidiaries
Government-owned companies of China
Motor vehicle manufacturers of Hong Kong
Vehicle manufacturing companies established in 1992
Companies formerly listed on the Hong Kong Stock Exchange
Former companies in the Hang Seng Index